The 2018 Grambling State Tigers football team represents Grambling State University in the 2018 NCAA Division I FCS football season. The Tigers are led by fifth-year head coach Broderick Fobbs and play their home games at Eddie Robinson Stadium in Grambling, Louisiana as members of the West Division of the Southwestern Athletic Conference (SWAC).

Previous season
The Tigers finished the 2017 season 11–2, 7–0 in SWAC play to win the West Division. They defeated Alcorn State in the SWAC Championship Game, receiving the conference's bid to the Celebration Bowl where they lost to North Carolina A&T.

Preseason

SWAC football media day
During the SWAC football media day held in Birmingham, Alabama on July 13, 2018, the Tigers were predicted to win the West Division.

Media poll

Presason All-SWAC Team
The Tigers led all SWAC schools by having 15 players selected to Preseason All-SWAC Teams.

Preseason Defensive Player of the Year
De'Arius Christmas – Sr. LB

Offense

1st team

William Waddell – Jr. OL

Kyle Davis – So. OL

Darrell Clark – Jr. WR

Jordan Jones – Jr. TE

2nd team

Quintin Guice – Jr. WR

Defense

1st team

Linwood Banks – Sr. DL

La’Allan Clark – Sr. DL

Brandon Varner – Sr. DL

De’Arius Christmas – Sr. LB

Percy Cargo – Sr. DB

2nd team

Anfernee Mullins – Jr. DL

De’Andre Hogues – Jr. LB

Malcolm Williams – Sr. LB

Dedrick Shy – Sr. DB

Special teams

1st team

Marc Orozco – Sr. K

Award watch lists

Roster

Schedule

Source: Schedule

Game summaries

at Louisiana

at Northwestern State

Alabama State

Prairie View A&M (State Fair Classic)

Oklahoma Panhandle State

at Texas Southern

at Alcorn State

Arkansas–Pine Bluff

Mississippi Valley State

at Alabama A&M

vs. Southern (Bayou Classic)

Ranking movements

References

Grambling State
Grambling State Tigers football seasons
Grambling State Tigers football